The 1988 New Orleans Saints season was the team's 22nd as a member of the National Football League (NFL). They were unable to match their previous season's output of 12–3, winning only ten games and missing the playoffs (and losing the division) by a tiebreaker, going 6-6 vs. NFC opponents compared to 8-4 for the San Francisco 49ers and Los Angeles Rams. Road losses to the Washington Redskins and Minnesota Vikings, as well as a sweep by San Francisco, ended up being the difference in New Orleans staying home and the California teams advancing.

Offseason

NFL Draft

Personnel

Staff

Roster

Schedule 

Note: Intra-division opponents are in bold text.

Game summaries

Week 1

Week 2

Week 3 
The Saints won for the first time in Detroit going 0-4-1 in their previous five trips to Michigan (three to Tiger Stadium and two to the Pontiac Silverdome).

Week 4

Week 5

Week 6

Week 7

Week 8 
The Saints defeated the Raiders for the first time in six meetings (the 1971 matchup, the first between the teams, ended in a 21-21 tie).

Week 9

Week 10

Week 11

Week 12 
In the Broncos' first appearance in the Louisiana Superdome since Super Bowl XII 11 years earlier, the Saints defeated Denver for the first time in five tries, and posted their largest margin of victory at the time.

Week 13

Week 14

Week 15

Week 16

Standings

References 

New Orleans Saints seasons
New Orleans
New